SCN may stand for:

Science and technology
.scn, SceneKit archive format
Satellite Catalog Number, an identification number given to satellites
Scandium nitride (ScN), an inorganic compound
Scene mode, a mode in digital cameras
Server change number, a counter variable used in client-server architecture
Sociocybernetics
Switched circuit network, i.e. the public switched telephone network
System change number, a stamp that defines a committed version in an Oracle Database
Thiocyanate, an organic compound in the cyanate family

Medicine
SCN1A to SCN11A, and SCN2B to SCN4B, sodium channel genes and beta subunits
Severe congenital neutropenia, rare disorders
Solid cell nests, in pathology
Soybean cyst nematode, a type of parasitic nematode
Suprachiasmatic nucleus, in the brain's hypothalamus

Communications & media
SCN (TV station), a TV station in Broken Hill, New South Wales, Australia
Saskatchewan Communications Network, a TV channel
Southern Command Network, an American Forces Network
SAP Community Network, of SAP SE users
SCN, former branding of GLV/BCV, a TV station in Victoria, Australia

Organizations
 Sisters of Charity of Nazareth, a Roman Catholic religious order
 Supervisory Council of the North, an Afghan military unit
 Supreme Court of Nigeria

Other uses
Saarbrücken Airport (IATA: SCN), in Saarland, Germany
Scottish Candidate Number, a student identifier
Sicilian language (ISO 639: scn)